The 2004 Houston Astros season was the 43rd season for the Major League Baseball (MLB) franchise in Houston, Texas. Five years removed from opening Minute Maid Park, the Astros hosted the All-Star Game, which was the first held in Houston since 1986. Having limped into the All-Star break with a 44–44 record, Phil Garner was named to replace Jimy Williams as manager.  The Astros finished second in the Central division and captured the NL Wild Card. The Astros won a postseason series for the first time in franchise history by defeating the Atlanta Braves in the National League Division Series (NLDS), scoring an NLDS-record 36 runs.  Roger Clemens won the NL Cy Young Award, becoming the fourth pitcher to win the award in both leagues, and the only one with seven overall.

Offseason
November 3, 2003:  Traded Billy Wagner to the Philadelphia Phillies for Brandon Duckworth, Taylor Buchholz, and Ezequiel Astacio.
December 16, 2003:  Signed free agent starting pitcher Andy Pettite.
 January 19, 2004:  Signed free agent starting pitcher Roger Clemens.
March 25, 2004:  Traded Juan DeLeon (minors) to the New York Yankees for Mike Lamb.

Regular season

Overview

First half
When he hit his sixth career grand slam against the Milwaukee Brewers on April 9, first baseman Jeff Bagwell tied a club record.  Starting pitcher Roger Clemens was named National League Pitcher of the Month in April after going 5–0 in a win–loss record (W–L) with a 1.95 earned run average (ERA), 32 strikeouts and 14 bases on balls in  innings pitched.  In just one start did he allow more than one run.  Clemens passed Steve Carlton to move into then-second place behind Nolan Ryan on the all-time strikeout list on May 6 against the Pittsburgh Pirates in a 6–2 victory while striking out nine and bringing his career total to 4,140.  In May, outfielder Lance Berkman produced a .785 slugging percentage with 24 runs batted in (RBI), winning his first career National League Player of the Month honors.

In a three-team deal involving the Kansas City Royals and Oakland Athletics, the Astros acquired center fielder Carlos Beltrán.  The Royals sent Beltrán to Houston for minor league catcher John Buck and cash.   The A's sent minor leaguers pitcher Mike Wood and first baseman Mark Teahen to the Royals.  The Astros sent relief pitcher Octavio Dotel to the A's.  Dotel, the Astros' closer, had a 0–4 W–L with a 3.12 ERA in  innings pitched, 50 strikeouts and 14 saves in 17 opportunities.  He had replaced Billy Wagner in that role following his trade to Philadelphia in the previous off-season.

The Astros fired manager Jimy Williams and replaced him with Phil Garner at the All-Star break.  With a 44–44 record, the team had been slumping after spending the first month and a half of the season in first place in the National League Central division.  That was considered a disappointment due to hopes of reaching the World Series after signing free agent starting pitchers Clemens and Pettitte, and acquiring Beltrán weeks earlier.

Major League Baseball All-Star Game at Minute Maid Park

The 2004 Major League Baseball All-Star Game was the 75th playing of the midseason exhibition baseball game between the all-stars of the American League (AL) and National League (NL). The game was held on July 13, 2004, at Minute Maid Park in Houston, Texas, the Houston Astros' home stadium. The previous All-Star Game held in Houston was in 1986 in the Astrodome. In the Home Run Derby, Miguel Tejada of the Baltimore Orioles defeated Berkman in the final round, 5–4.

Three members of the Astros were in the starting lineup; Roger Clemens, who had played in the 1986 All-Star Game, was the starting pitcher, Jeff Kent was at second base, and Berkman was one of the three outfielders starting in the game.  Beltrán, first named to the American League team before the trade, was added to the National League team as a reserve.  The game had an attendance of 41,886 and boxing legend Muhammad Ali threw the ceremonial first pitch of the game.  The final result was the American League defeating the National League 9–4, thus awarding an AL team (which would eventually be the Boston Red Sox) home-field advantage in the World Series.

Second half
A triple play and a seven-run seventh inning on August 19 against Philadelphia highlighted an Astros 12–10 win.  With the Phillies leading 7–2, Todd Pratt grounded into a bases-loaded triple play in the fifth inning, Houston's first in 13 years.  Berkman, Craig Biggio, and Eric Bruntlett each homered in the seventh inning.

Bagwell recorded his 200th career stolen base on August 30 against the Cincinnati Reds to become the tenth player in MLB history to reach that plateau while hitting 400 home runs.  On September 18, Bagwell collected his 1,500th career RBI with a single in the third inning against the Brewers.  Two innings later, he homered for his 1,500th run scored, becoming just 29th player in MLB history and first Astro to reach both milestones.  Bagwell finished with 27 home runs, stopping a streak of eight consecutive seasons with at least 30 but extending a streak of 12 with at least 20.

The Astros won 36 of their final 46 games to win the National League wild card.

After the Astros acquired Beltrán from the Royals, he played 90 games batting .258 with 23 home runs, 53 RBI, and 28 stolen bases.  His combined totals in 2004 included 159 games with a .267 batting average, 38 home runs, 104 RBI, 42 stolen bases, and 121 runs scored.

Season standings

National League Central

Record vs. opponents

Transactions
April 17, 2004: Kirk Saarloos was traded by the Houston Astros to the Oakland Athletics for Chad Harville.
June 7, 2004: Hunter Pence was drafted by the Houston Astros in the 2nd round of the 2004 amateur draft. Player signed July 14, 2004.
June 7, 2004: J.R. Towles was drafted by the Houston Astros in the 20th round of the 2004 amateur draft. Player signed June 16, 2004.
June 17, 2004: Dave Weathers was traded by the New York Mets with Jeremy Griffiths to the Houston Astros for Richard Hidalgo.
June 28, 2004: Carlos Beltrán was traded from the Kansas City Royals to the Houston Astros in a three-team deal, which also sent relief pitcher Octavio Dotel from the Astros to the Oakland Athletics, while the Royals picked up Oakland minor leaguers (pitcher Mike Wood and third-baseman Mark Teahen) and Astros catcher John Buck.
September 7, 2004: Dave Weathers was released by the Houston Astros.

Roster

Player stats

Batting

Starters by position
Note: Pos = Position; G = Games played; AB = At bats; H = Hits; Avg. = Batting average; HR = Home runs; RBI = Runs batted in

Other batters
Note: G = Games played; AB = At Bats; H = Hits; Avg. = Batting average; HR = Home runs; RBI = Runs batted in

Pitching

Starting pitchers
Note: G = Games pitched; IP = Innings pitched; W = Wins; L = Losses; ERA = Earned run average; SO = Strikeouts

Other pitchers
Note: G = Games pitched; IP = Innings pitched; W = Wins; L = Losses; ERA = Earned run average; SO = Strikeouts

Relief pitchers
Note: G = Games pitched; IP = Innings pitched; W = Wins; L = Losses; SV = Saves; SO = Strikeouts

National League Divisional Playoffs

Atlanta Braves vs. Houston Astros
In Game 2, Bagwell hit his first career postseason home run off Mike Hampton in the first inning in a 4–2 extra-inning loss.

After seven failed attempts in 43 years of franchise history to win a playoff series, the Astros defeated the Atlanta Braves in five games for their first.  Behind the quartet dubbed the "Killer B's" – composed of Bagwell, Beltrán, Berkman and Biggio – who batted .395 (34-for-86) with eight home runs, 21 RBI and 24 runs scored, the Astros' offense ignited, scoring an NLDS-record 36 runs.  Beltrán homered four times in this series.

National League Championship Series

St. Louis Cardinals vs. Houston Astros
The Astros faced the St. Louis Cardinals in the playoffs for the first time in 2004 in the National League Championship Series (NLCS).  By hitting one home run in each of the first four home runs in the NLCS, including the game-winner in Game 4, Beltrán tied Barry Bonds' record for home runs in single postseason-record with eight, continuing a strong performance from the NLDS.  Counting a two home-run performance in Game 5 of the NLDS, that gave Beltrán at least one home run in a record-setting five consecutive postseason games, later eclipsed by Daniel Murphy's home runs in six consecutive postseason games in 2015.

Cardinals center fielder Jim Edmonds hit the game-winning home run off Dan Miceli in the 12th inning of Game 6, for a 6–4 final score and forcing a Game 7.  It was the third game Miceli lost of the 2004 postseason.

Awards and honors

Records
 Roger Clemens, Major league record seventh Cy Young Award won
 Brad Lidge, National League Record, Most Strikeouts in One Season by a Relief Pitcher (157)
 Carlos Beltrán:
 Post-season: Most home runs in consecutive games (5, since broken by Daniel Murphy)
 Single post-season:  Most home runs (8–tied with Barry Bonds)
 Houston Astros, NLDS-record for runs scored (36)

Awards
 All-Star Game selections:
 Roger Clemens, pitcher, starter
 Jeff Kent, second baseman, starter
 Lance Berkman, outfield, starter
 Carlos Beltrán, outfield, reserve
 Cy Young Award: Roger Clemens
 Pitcher of the Month: Roger Clemens (April)
 Player of the Month: Lance Berkman (May)

National League leaders
 Games started: Roy Oswalt (35)
 Winning percentage: Roger Clemens (.818)
 Wins: Roy Oswalt (20)

Farm system

References

External links
2004 Houston Astros season at Baseball Reference
Game Logs:
1st Half: Houston Astros Game Log on ESPN.com
2nd Half: Houston Astros Game Log on ESPN.com
Batting Statistics: Houston Astros Batting Stats on ESPN.com
Pitching Statistics: Houston Astros Pitching Stats on ESPN.com

Houston Astros seasons
Houston Astros
Houston Astros